The 2016–17 South Carolina Gamecocks men's basketball team represented the University of South Carolina during the 2016–17 NCAA Division I men's basketball season. The team's head coach, Frank Martin, was in his fifth season at South Carolina. The team played its home games at Colonial Life Arena in Columbia, South Carolina as a member of the Southeastern Conference. They finished the season 26–11, 12–6 in SEC play to finish in a tie for third place. They lost in the quarterfinals of the SEC tournament to Alabama. They received an at-large bid to the NCAA tournament where they defeated Marquette, Duke, Baylor and SEC member Florida to advance to their first final four in school history where they lost to Gonzaga. 26 wins is the most wins in school history.

Previous season
The Gamecocks finished the season 25–9, 11–7 in SEC play to finish in a three-way tie for third place. They lost in the quarterfinals of the SEC tournament to Georgia. They were invited to the National Invitation Tournament where they defeated High Point in the first round to advance to the second round where they lost to Georgia Tech.

Departures

Incoming Transfers

Recruits

Roster

Schedule and results
Source: 

|-
!colspan=9 style=| Exhibition

|-
!colspan=9 style=| Non-conference games

|-
!colspan=9 style=| SEC regular season

|-
!colspan=9 style= | SEC Tournament

|-
!colspan=9 style= | NCAA tournament

Rankings

*AP does not release post-NCAA tournament rankings

References

South Carolina Gamecocks men's basketball seasons
South Carolina
South Carolina
NCAA Division I men's basketball tournament Final Four seasons
Game
Game